Villanueva is a town and a municipality in the Chinandega department of Nicaragua.

References

Municipalities of the Chinandega Department